The Steptoean Positive Carbon Isotope Excursion (SPICE) was a geological event which occurred about 494.6 million years ago near the beginning of the International Furongian Epoch of the Cambrian Period. The SPICE event was a positive shift in carbon isotope (δ13C) values which lasted for around 2 to 4 million years. This shift is interpreted to be a global disturbance in the carbon cycle, affecting both the ocean and atmosphere. Regional sea level changes, a rise in sea water temperatures, ocean anoxia, and trilobite and brachiopod extinctions are associated with the SPICE event, although the exact mechanism(s) driving these events is still unconfirmed.

One proposed cause of the SPICE is an increase in the burial of organic carbon, perhaps caused by increased primary productivity or enhanced organic matter preservation due to ocean deoxygenation (i.e. anoxia or euxinia). The spread of seafloor anoxia has also been proposed as the kill mechanism for the extinctions of marine organisms.

References

Events that forced the climate
Cambrian events